First-seeded Daphne Akhurst defeated Esna Boyd 6–1, 6–3, in the final to win the women's singles tennis title at the 1926 Australasian Championships.

Seeds
The seeded players are listed below. Daphne Akhurst is the champion; others show the round in which they were eliminated.

 Daphne Akhurst (champion)
 Esna Boyd (finalist)
 Sylvia Harper (semifinals)
 Marjorie Cox (semifinals)
 Meryl O'Hara Wood (quarterfinals)
 Kathleen Le Messurier (quarterfinals)
 Minnie Richardson (quarterfinals)
 Beryl Turner (quarterfinals)

Draw

Key
 Q = Qualifier
 WC = Wild card
 LL = Lucky loser
 r = Retired

Finals

Earlier rounds

Section 1

Section 2

External links
 1926 Australian Championships on ITFtennis.com, the source for this draw

1926 in women's tennis
Women's Singles
1926 in Australian women's sport